MV Monet is a cruise ship operated by Noble Caledonia, based in United Kingdom.

Built in 1970, Monet has been refurbished and designed in 1997 to serve as a large luxury yacht.

Cruise ships
1970 ships